F. viridis  may refer to:
 Fragaria viridis, a strawberry species native to Europe and central Asia
 Frederickena viridis, the black-throated antshrike, a bird species found in Brazil, French Guiana, Guyana, Suriname and Venezuela

See also
 Viridis (disambiguation)